Stanisław Świerk (born 19 June 1935 in Jurków – died 16 January 2004 in Wrocław) is a Polish football player and coach.

Career

Playing career
He played for Czarnych Szczecin, Lotnik Warszawa, Stal Rzeszow, Unia Oświęcim and Motor Lublin.

Coaching career
He managed Motor Lublin, Moto Jelcz Oława, Odra Wrocław, Górnik Wałbrzych, GKS Tychy, Widzew Łódź, Zaglebie Lubin, Odra Opole, Ślęza Wrocław and Śląsk Wrocław.

References

1935 births
2004 deaths
Polish footballers
Motor Lublin players
Stal Rzeszów players
Polish football managers
Śląsk Wrocław managers
Odra Opole managers
Widzew Łódź managers
Zagłębie Lubin managers
GKS Tychy managers
Górnik Wałbrzych (football) managers
Sportspeople from Lesser Poland Voivodeship
People from Limanowa County
Association footballers not categorized by position